Saints and Soldiers: The Void is a 2014 war drama film directed and written by Ryan Little, and is the third installment in the Saints and Soldiers franchise, following Saints and Soldiers and Saints and Soldiers: Airborne Creed. The film stars K. Danor Gerald, Adam Gregory, and Matt Meese. The Void was the most expensive of the Saints and Soldiers films due to its use of tanks. It was filmed in Alpine, Utah. The film received mixed reviews with some critics calling it a "riveting drama" and some critics stating that more focus on writing and execution would have improved the film. In some countries the film is called Saints and Soldiers: Battle of the Tanks.

Plot
In May 1945, remnants of the German Army continue to fight in the Harz mountains, nicknamed "The Void" by American troops. An American M18 Hellcat tank destroyer, "The Avenging Angel", fires on a German prison and liberates the Allied prisoners held there, including Lieutenant Goss (Ben Urie). The next day the prisoners are to be transported to the rear by Sergeant Jesse Owens (K. Danor Gerald) and Private Perry (Alex Boyé). Owens is not respected by some of the white soldiers because he is African-American.

Captain Briton McConkie orders Sergeant John Atwood, commander of the Angel, and Max Whitaker, to take their respective tanks to clear the roads of any Germans to protect Owens' and Perry's convoy. The two tanks travel along the roads, with some tension arising between Private Daniel Barlow (Matt Meese) and Rodney Mitchell. Corporal Carey Simms (Adam Gregory) stops the arguments. The convoy comes across a fake body in the road, where a hidden German Panzer III tank fires, destroying Perry's truck, killing everyone inside. The Germans open fire at Owens's truck, and he and Goss manage to escape. Further encounters ensue, ending when Owens destroys a German tank with a panzerfaust. Barlow and Mitchell reconcile from their previous arguments, and Simms and Owens befriend one another over the course of the conflict.

Cast

 K. Danor Gerald as Technical Sergeant Jesse Owens
 Adam Gregory as  Corporal Carey Simms
 Matt Meese as Private Daniel Barlow
 Timothy S. Shoemaker as Sergeant John Atwood 
 Michael Todd Behrens as Rodney 'Ramrod' Mitchell
 Ben Urie as Lieutenant Goss
 Christoph Malzl as Stalag Commander
 David Morgan as Lt. Klaus Shonbeck
 Nate Harward as P.O.W Camp Soldier
 Brenden Whitney as Pvt. Nelson
 Jeff Birk as Capt. F. Briton McConkie
 Joel Bishop as Sgt. Max Whitaker
 Alex Boyé as Pvt. Perry
 Allan Groves as Sgt. Kesler
 Logan Rogan as Prisoner #1
 Blake Webb as Prisoner #2
 Jeff Johnson as Crossroads MP
 Philip Malzl as Frederick Kardoff
 Becca Ingram as Gerta Kardoff
 Aunna Abel as Aunna Kardoff
 Lance Jensen as Corporal Jensen
 Randy Beard as German Tank Commander
 Andrew W. Johnson as Private Wolsey
 Richie T. Steadman as Sergeant Steadman
 Scott Swofford as General Terry Allen
 Terence Johnson as Corporal Harrison
 Lonzo Liggins as Pvt. Cooper
 Carlton Bluford as Pvt. Smitty
 Stacey Harkey as Pvt. Gaines
 Bart Johnson as Capt. Derrick Davis
 Cardiff Gerhardt as Young Soldier #1
 Taylor Risk as Young Soldier #2
 Talon G. Ackerman as Fritz Bauer

Production
Ryan Little wrote the script for Saints and Soldiers: The Void a few years before it was released. He had K. Danor Gerald picked out for the role of Owens before production even started, having worked with Gerald on Forever Strong and House of Fears. Saints and Soldiers: The Void was the most expensive to film of the Saints and Soldiers franchise, because of the use of tanks. Ryan Little and Adam Abel gathered tanks from Utah, New Mexico, Colorado, and Arizona to use for filming. It was filmed in Alpine, Utah. During production, Gerald would be the last cast member to eat lunch to better understand racism for his role of an African-American soldier.

Release and reception
The film was released on August 14, 2014, in a select number of theaters. The film was released on DVD in November 2014. Saints and Soldiers: The Void received mixed reviews. The Salt Lake Tribune called the film a, "riveting action drama with a strong message". However, Deseret News wrote that the film, "offers an important message and some nice visuals. But there's still the feeling that a little more focus on writing and execution would have etched a more enduring experience."

References

External links
 
 
 

2014 films
2010s war films
American World War II films
Mormon cinema
2014 war drama films
2014 drama films
American war drama films
Western Front of World War II films
Films about the United States Army
Saints and Soldiers films
Films set in 1945
Films set in Germany
Harold B. Lee Library-related 21st century articles
World War II films based on actual events
2010s English-language films
Films directed by Ryan Little
2010s American films